Clarence "Clancy" Williams, Jr. (September 24, 1942 – September 21, 1986) was an American football defensive back who played eight seasons in the National Football League (NFL), all with the Los Angeles Rams.

Born in Texas, Williams was raised in suburban Seattle and graduated from Renton High School. He played college football at Washington State University in Pullman and was an All-American as a senior in 1964. Williams played on both sides of the ball: on offense at halfback and defense at cornerback. WSU sports historian Dick Fry made the case Williams was the finest two-way player in Washington State history.  He was selected in the first round of the 1965 NFL Draft (ninth overall) by the Rams. 

After football, Williams worked in Los Angeles in banking and at the Los Angeles Times newspaper. He died of cancer in Seattle at age 43 in 1986. and was interred at Greenwood Memorial Park in Renton.

His son Clarence III also played football at Washington State and in the NFL.

References

External links

1942 births
1986 deaths
People from Beaumont, Texas
American football cornerbacks
Los Angeles Rams players
Washington State Cougars football players
Deaths from cancer in Washington (state)